The 2010 Kent Predators season was the team's first season as a professional indoor football franchise and first in the Indoor Football League (IFL). One of twenty-five teams competing in the IFL for the 2010 season, the Kent, Washington-based Kent Predators were members of the Pacific Division of the Intense Conference.

Under the leadership of head coach William McCarthy, the team played their home games at the ShoWare Center in Kent, Washington.

The franchise was originally going to play in Wasilla, Alaska as the Arctic Predators, but complications between the ownership and the would-be head coach led to difficulty in obtaining a lease, so the IFL and the Arctic Predators split ways.

Schedule

Regular season

Standings

Roster

References

External links
Kent Predators official statistics

Kent Predators
Kent Predators
American football in Washington (state)